Nine referendums were held in Switzerland during 1996. The first five were held on 10 March on revising article 116 of the Swiss Federal Constitution regarding language, abolishing the cantons' responsibilities for providing army equipment, abolishing the federal requirement to purchase distilling equipment, abolishing federal financing of parking areas at rail stations, and whether municipality of Vellerat (then part of the canton of Bern) should become part of the canton of Jura. All proposals except the one regarding army equipment were approved.

The next two referendums were held on 9 June on a law on governmental and administrative organisation and a counter-proposal to the popular initiative "peasants and consumers–for a nature-oriented farming". The counter-proposal was approved, whilst the new law was rejected. The final two referendums were held on 1 December on a popular initiative "against illegal immigration" and an amendment to the federal law on labour in trade and industry. Both were rejected by voters.

Results

References

1996 elections in Switzerland
1996 referendums
Referendums in Switzerland